Yvonne Joyce Craig (May 16, 1937 – August 17, 2015) was an American actress and ballerina, who was renowned for her role as Barbara Gordon/Batgirl in the 1960s television series Batman. Other notable roles in her career include Dorothy Johnson in the 1963 movie It Happened at the World's Fair, Azalea Tatum in the 1964 movie Kissin' Cousins and as the green-skinned Orion Marta in the Star Trek episode "Whom Gods Destroy" (1969).

The Huffington Post called her "a pioneer of female superheroes" for television.

Early life
Yvonne Craig was born in Taylorville, Illinois, and was raised in Columbus, Ohio. In 1951, her family moved to the Oak Cliff neighborhood in Dallas, Texas, where she attended W. H. Adamson High School and then Sunset High School, from which she did not graduate due to the lack of "a single PE credit".

Career

Ballet
After being discovered by Alexandra Danilova, a ballerina and instructor, Craig joined the Ballet Russe de Monte Carlo as its youngest corps de ballet member. This training was helpful when she performed stunts while playing Batgirl. She left the ballet company in 1957 "over a disagreement on casting changes" and moved to Los Angeles in the hopes of continuing her dancing career, but found herself cast in film roles.

Acting

One of her earliest television roles was in an episode of the TV series Perry Mason ("The Case of the Lazy Lover", 1958) alongside Neil Hamilton, who played her stepfather (later Hamilton played Police Commissioner James Gordon, Batgirl's father). Shortly afterwards, she appeared in three films—The Young Land, The Gene Krupa Story, and Gidget (all 1959)—and also guest-starred in the TV series Mr. Lucky as Beverly Mills in the episode "Little Miss Wow" (also 1959). Craig appeared with Bing Crosby in High Time (1960) and in Seven Women from Hell (1961), featured alongside Cesar Romero. In 1962, she guest-starred on the Western Laramie in the episode "The Long Road Back".

Craig appeared with Elvis Presley in two films: It Happened at the World's Fair (1963) and Kissin' Cousins (1964). She also starred in the science fiction film Mars Needs Women (1966) and appeared in In Like Flint (1967) as a Russian ballet dancer opposite James Coburn.

During the 1960s, Craig regularly appeared in television drama series. She appeared five times on The Many Loves of Dobie Gillis, portraying five separate girlfriends for the titular character between 1959 and 1962. In 1960, she played Jo, a young photographer with Charles Bronson in Man with a Camera. In 1964, Craig guest-starred as Carol, an underwater photographer, on Voyage to the Bottom of the Sea ("Turn Back the Clock"). In 1965, Craig appeared in The Big Valley ("The Invaders") and Kentucky Jones ("Kentucky′s Vacation"),

Craig played a Navy nurse with exotic Arabian dance skills in an episode of McHale's Navy ("Pumpkin Takes Over") and in an episode of The Big Valley with Lee Majors and Barbara Stanwyck; both aired in 1965. That same year, she appeared in an episode of The Man from U.N.C.L.E. ("The Brain-Killer Affair"), where she helps solve the mystery of a brain-endangering poison. The following year, she came back as an U.N.C.L.E. employee in a theatrical film, One Spy Too Many, expanded from the episode "The Alexander the Greater Affair". In an episode of The Wild Wild West ("The Night of the Grand Emir") in 1966, she played an assassin who performs an exotic Arabian dance. In a 1968 episode of The Ghost & Mrs. Muir ("Haunted Honeymoon"), she played Gladys Zimmerman, a bride-to-be who was stranded overnight at Gull Cottage.

Batman

From September 1967 until March 1968, Craig appeared in her highest-profile role as Batgirl/Barbara Gordon for the third and final season of the 1960s ABC TV series Batman. As Batgirl, she wore a purple and yellow outfit and rode a "purple motorcycle with white lace trim", whereas her alter ego Barbara Gordon was the librarian daughter of Commissioner Gordon. The New York Times praised her for "add[ing] a scrappy girl-power element" to a TV series it described as "campy".

During this time, Craig appeared as a contestant on the game show The Dating Game (1967).

Craig reprised her Batgirl role in a 1974 public service announcement (PSA) for equal pay for women sponsored by the U.S. Department of Labor Wage and Hour Division. In the PSA, Batman and Robin were tied to a post amid the threat of a ticking time bomb, but Batgirl refused to release them because she was paid less than Robin, in violation of the Federal Equal Pay Law. The PSA was written and directed by Sidney Galanty, and narrated by William Dozier, who had narrated the Batman TV series. Dick Gautier played Batman this time, because Adam West was, at the time, trying to distance himself from that role.

Craig reportedly felt some connection to the character, and was sad that Barbara Gordon was shot and paralyzed by the Joker in the graphic novel Batman: The Killing Joke (1988).

After Batman
After Batman, Craig continued to act sporadically in movies and television. She appeared in guest roles in It Takes a Thief, The Mod Squad, Mannix, and Emergency!. Craig also appeared on Star Trek as Marta, a green-skinned Orion slave girl in the episode "Whom Gods Destroy" (1969). From 1969 to 1972, she appeared in four episodes of the comedy series Love, American Style. In a 1970 episode of Land of the Giants ("Wild Journey"), she played one-half of a humanoid, time-observing duo (with Bruce Dern), who chase two of the Earth castaways (series stars Gary Conway and Don Marshall) into the past, ultimately forcing them to relive the flight that sent them to the giants' planet. In 1973, she appeared in a first-season episode of Kojak ("Dark Sunday"), and in 1977, she made a guest appearance in The Six Million Dollar Man ("The Infiltrators").

Later life
When her Hollywood career ended, she ventured into private business. She was briefly a co-producer of industrial shows, before starting a new career as a real estate broker. From 2009 to 2011, she voiced Grandma on the animated children's series Olivia. Craig published an autobiography called From Ballet to the Batcave and Beyond (2000). She appeared in the documentary film Ballets Russes (2005).

She was also a philanthropist and advocate for workers unions, free mammograms, and equal pay for women.

Death
Craig died at age 78 at her home in Pacific Palisades, Los Angeles, California, on August 17, 2015, from breast cancer that had spread to her liver.

Filmography

Film

Television

Bibliography

References

External links

Memorial benches
 
 

1937 births
2015 deaths
Actresses from Illinois
Actresses from Los Angeles
American ballerinas
American film actresses
American television actresses
Ballet Russe de Monte Carlo dancers
People from Taylorville, Illinois
Deaths from breast cancer
Deaths from cancer in California
Deaths from liver cancer
W. H. Adamson High School alumni
Sunset High School (Texas) alumni
20th-century American actresses
21st-century American women
20th-century American ballet dancers